Suleiman Husseini Adamu, known as Suleiman Adamu Kazaure, is the Nigerian Minister of Water Resources under president Muhammadu Buhari's administration.

See also
Politics of Nigeria

References

Nigerian government officials
1963 births
Living people
Place of birth missing (living people)
Date of birth missing (living people)